The March 8 Alliance is a coalition of political parties and independents in Lebanon formed in 2005 that are united by their pro-Syrian stance and their opposition to the March 14 Alliance. It was the ruling coalition in Lebanon with the government headed by Prime Minister Najib Mikati from June 2011 until March 2013.

History
The name dates back to 8 March 2005 when different parties called for a mass demonstration in downtown Beirut in response to the Cedar Revolution. The demonstration thanked Syria for helping stop the Lebanese Civil War and the aid in stabilising Lebanon and supporting the Lebanese resistance to the Israeli occupation.

Inclusion of Free Patriotic Movement
The Free Patriotic Movement (FPM) was the basis of the March 14 Alliance movement. FPM launched the Liberation War against the Syrian Army on 14 March 1989 and participated in all demonstrations against the Syrian occupation until the Cedar Revolution's mass demonstration on 14 March 2005. The FPM split from the March 14 Alliance on 6 February 2006, when its leader Michel Aoun signed a Memorandum of Understanding with Hezbollah. FPM considered its project against the Syrian government completed when the Syrian army left Lebanon at the end of April 2005.

Free Patriotic Movement led by Michel Aoun eventually joined the rival March 8 Alliance, becoming one of its principal coalition partners.

Ruling Alliance (2011–2013)
The Progressive Socialist Party left the March 14 alliance in January 2011 after being one of its cornerstones and ostensibly aligned itself with the alliance's Change and Reform Bloc after Walid Jumblatt visited Damascus. This move gave the alliance and its partners a majority in the parliament, enabling them to name Najib Mikati as prime minister to form the Lebanese government of June 2011.
 
The government led by March 8 Alliance survived 22 months until Mikati's resignation on 23 March 2013.

2016 presidential elections 
After a presidential vacuum that lasted from 23 April 2014 until 31 October 2016, the Parliament was able to elect MP and former General Michel Aoun, who in turn nominated March 14 member Saad Hariri as Prime Minister.

2018 legislative elections 
The alliance emerged victorious as they gathered 76 seats out of 128 (60%), in the first legislative elections since 2009.

2019 cabinet 
The Alliance had 18 out of 30 ministers (60%) in the Lebanese Cabinet; it was equally represented in both parliament and cabinet.

September 2021 Cabinet 
The Alliance has 16 out of 24 ministers (66%) in the current Lebanese Cabinet; it is equally represented in both parliament and cabinet.

Constituent parties

It currently holds 60 of 128 seats in the parliament after the 2022 elections and consists of:

References

 
2005 establishments in Lebanon
Political parties established in 2005